Freedmen's Normal Institute was a school in Maryville, Tennessee in Eastern Tennessee established to train African American teachers. The school was built in 1872 and opened in 1873. It was co-founded by newspaper publisher William Bennett Scott Sr., Thomas B. Lillard Sr., others, and support from Quakers. It closed in 1901.

The University of Tennessee has a photo of a group on its porch and another of some pupils. A historical marker commemorates the school.

The Friends Church (Maryville, Tennessee) had a role in establishing the school.

Charles Warner Cansler attended the school.

References

1873 establishments
Schools in Tennessee